Ian Gregson may refer to:

 Ian Gregson (athlete) (born 1962), Canadian Paralympian, politician, musician and actor
 Ian Gregson (poet) (born 1953), English novelist and poet